Ivory Coast competed at the 2009 World Championships in Athletics from 15–23 August in Berlin. Neither of the two athletes advanced beyond the qualifying round in their event.

Team selection

Track and road events

Field and combined events

Results

Men
Track and road events

Women
Field and combined events

References

External links
Official competition website

Nations at the 2009 World Championships in Athletics
World Championships in Athletics
Ivory Coast at the World Championships in Athletics